Česká Rybná is a municipality and village in Ústí nad Orlicí District in the Pardubice Region of the Czech Republic. It has about 400 inhabitants.

References

External links

Česká Rybná on ceskarybna.eu

Villages in Ústí nad Orlicí District